Jan Koukal (born 20 June 1983 in Prague) is a professional squash player who represented Czech Republic. He reached a career-high world ranking of World No. 39 in January 2005.

References

External links 
 
 

Czech male squash players
Living people
1983 births
Sportspeople from Prague
Competitors at the 2017 World Games